The 2002 NRL Grand Final was the conclusive and premiership-deciding game of the 2002 NRL season. It took place on Sunday, 6 October 2002, at Sydney's Telstra Stadium. 80,130 people saw the Sydney Roosters beat the New Zealand Warriors 30–8. The Clive Churchill Medalist was Craig Fitzgibbon of the Sydney Roosters. The match was also broadcast live in the United States by Fox Sports World.

Background

The 2002 NRL season was the 95th season of professional rugby league football in Australia and the fifth to be run by the National Rugby League. Fifteen teams competed for the Minor premiership which, after the Bulldogs were relegated to the bottom of the ladder for salary cap breaches, was claimed by the New Zealand Warriors. The top eight finishing teams were then reduced to two over the finals series.

Sydney Roosters
The 2002 Sydney Roosters season was the 95th in the club's history. Coached by Ricky Stuart and captained by Brad Fittler, they finished the NRL's 2002 Premiership regular season in 4th place.

New Zealand Warriors

The 2002 New Zealand Warriors season was the 8th in the club's history. Coached by Daniel Anderson and captained by Stacey Jones and Kevin Campion, they finished the NRL's 2002 Premiership regular season in 1st place.

Teams
It was the final game for Warriors fullback Ivan Cleary and Roosters winger Brett Mullins before their playing retirements.

Match details 
Both teams entered the cauldron of Telstra Stadium with great form heading into the contest. The Warriors had won their 2 Finals matches they had had. In Week 1 they beat the Canberra Raiders 36–20 in Auckland, before beating the Cronulla-Sutherland Sharks 16–10 at Telstra Stadium. The Roosters had beaten the Sharks 32–20 at the Sydney Football Stadium, then beating the Newcastle Knights in Sydney. Finally they beat the Brisbane Broncos (whom the Roosters were beaten by in the 2000 decider) in Sydney again.

A pre-match performance by Billy Idol was attempted but due to a power outage had to be aborted.

1st half
The opening minutes were spent with both teams trading blows, the Roosters mainly with the upper hand. However it took till the 23rd minute for the deadlock to be broken, the Roosters scoring through Shannon Hegarty. Craig Fitzgibbon converted the try and the Sydney Roosters led 6–0. Soon, the Warriors found their rhythm and Ivan Cleary got a penalty goal to make the score 6–2 to the Roosters. It remained that way to half time, the Sydney Roosters holding the upper hand over the New Zealand Warriors.

2nd half
The second half started rather differently. Within 6 minutes the New Zealand Warriors took the lead. Stacey Jones darted over and the Warriors had the lead when Ivan Cleary converted from in front for a 6–8 score to the New Zealand Warriors. As the game approached its final quarter, a brilliant 40–20 from Roosters five-eighth and captain Brad Fittler saw the Roosters outfit on the front foot again. Craig Wing crashed over, Craig Fitzgibbon converted and the Roosters had a 12–8 lead. It looked as though it was going to be a tense finish but tries to Fitzgibbon, Chris Flannery and Bryan Fletcher as well as 3 conversions from Fitzgibbon meant the Sydney Roosters ran out 30–8 victors over the New Zealand Warriors.  The grand final victory ended a 27-year premiership drought at the club.

Match summary

World Club Challenge 

The Sydney Roosters' victory in the Grand Final meant that they gained the right to travel to England and play in the World Club Challenge against the winners of the 2002 Super League grand final winners, St. Helens.

References

External links
2002 NRL Grand Final at NRL.com
Match replay at NRL.com
2002 NRL Grand Final at rugbyleagueproject.org

NRL Grand Finals
Sydney Roosters matches
New Zealand Warriors matches
Grand final
NRL Grand final